Flavio Cipolla was the defending champion but chose to compete in PBZ Zagreb Indoors instead.
Danai Udomchoke won the tournament after defeating Samuel Groth 7–6(7–5), 6–3 in the final.

Seeds

Draw

Finals

Top half

Bottom half

References 
Main Draw
Qualifying Draw

2012 Singles
McDonald's Burnie International - Singles
2012 in Australian tennis